Tirumala Deva Raya (reign 1565–1572 CE) was the first Crowned King of the Vijayanagara Empire from the Aravidu Dynasty. He was the younger brother of Rama Raya and son-in-law of Krishna Deva Raya.

References

Bibliography
 
 
 

1578 deaths
16th-century Indian monarchs
People of the Vijayanagara Empire
People from Anantapur district
Indian Hindus
Year of birth unknown